Donaldson Field Airport  is a public airport six miles (10 km) south of the central business district of Greenville, a city in Greenville County, South Carolina, United States. It is located at the Donaldson Center Industrial Air Park and is owned by the City and County of Greenville.

Although most U.S. airports use the same three-letter location identifier for the FAA and IATA, Donaldson Field Airport is assigned GYH by the FAA and GDC by the IATA.

History 

Greenville Army Air Base opened in 1942 during World War II. It was later known as Greenville Air Force Base. In 1951 it was renamed Donaldson Air Force Base, in honor of Captain John O. Donaldson, a World War I flying ace. The U.S. Air Force announced Donaldson's closure in 1962. The City and County of Greenville took title of the facilities in 1964 and named it Donaldson Center Industrial Air Park.

Airlines and destinations

Cargo

Facilities and aircraft 

For the 12-month period ending October 31, 2005, the airport had 45,375 aircraft operations, an average of 124 per day: 84% general aviation, 10% air taxi and 6% military. At that time there were 83 aircraft based at this airport: 80% single-engine, 14% multi-engine and 6% jet.

The site is also home to an Army Aviation Support Facility of the South Carolina Army National Guard which opened on February 19, 2014.

The fixed-base operators (FBO) located on the field are Avserve and Donaldson Jet Center which is the other operation along with Greenville Jet Center which is located at KGMU.

In 2019, Lockheed Martin established production of the F-16V (Viper) at a hangar at the airport.

References

External links 
 Donaldson Center Airport page at Donaldson Center Airport Industrial Air Park website
 
 

Airports in South Carolina
Buildings and structures in Greenville County, South Carolina
Transportation in Greenville County, South Carolina
Transportation in Greenville, South Carolina
1964 establishments in South Carolina